Qamar al-Din is an apricot fruit leather, which is popularly made into apricot juice or nectar beverage from Arab cuisine that is famously consumed during the Muslim holy month of Ramadan. It is believed to be from Syria. It was first produced in the Ghouta, where the variety of apricots most suitable for qamar al-din was first grown. Qamar al-din is enjoyed across the Middle East and North Africa as well as in Somalia, though Syrian qamar al-din is still believed to be the best because the variety of apricots most suitable for making qamar al-din grow only in Syria and southwestern Turkey. It is known as lavāshak in Iran and is served as a dried fruit roll.

Etymology
Several theories have been proposed for the origin of qamar al-din's name. One theory holds that it was named for its inventor, a Syrian man named Qamar al-Din. He was said to have been so handsome that he resembled the moon (qamar), hence his name.

Another theory holds that apricot season coincided with the sighting of the new moon marking the beginning of Ramadan in the year when qamar al-din was invented. A similar theory, widespread in Egypt, traces the name's origin to a Caliph who was known to celebrate with qamar al-din upon seeing the crescent moon during Ramadan.

Method of preparation
To produce Qamar al-din, apricots and sugar are boiled over a fire and then strained through a wooden strainer that is soaked in olive oil. The apricots are then left to dry in direct sunlight. Once it has completely dried, it is then packaged, shipped, and sold. This dried apricot leather is thicker, more consistent, and has a stronger flavor than ordinary apricot leather, and is thus more suitable for making qamar al-din. Making the drink from this apricot leather only requires adding rosewater or orange blossom water, though apricot pieces (fresh or dried) and ice are often added as well. Sometimes, some of the floral water is replaced with orange juice or plain water. Qamar al-din is traditionally served thick and cold, and it is believed to be especially fortifying and a good source of energy, electrolytes, and hydration, all of which are crucial after a day of fasting. Some in the Levant add pine nuts and ice to their qamar al-din, making a beverage that resembles a thicker, apricot-flavored version of jallab. In Syria, it is also casually eaten without being turned into a drink, as the fruit roll to snack on itself. A common variation is wrapping the fruit leather around a piece of walnut.

The Iranian variety, lavāshak, is prepared by heating seeded fruits with some water until they form a purée and then passed through a sieve to dispose of any fruit peel. The purée is then heated further to form a thicker paste and consequently left in the sun to dry out and served after a few days. Traditionally lavāshak is made from plums or apricot however modern and commercial varieties may use apple, pomegranate, cherry, barberry and Cornelian cherries as the fruit base.

Notes

References

External links 
 Nutritional information
 Recipe for Qamar al-din from Fatakat Tabakh
 Recipe for Qamar al-din from 7awaa World
 Advantages Of Qamar Al-Din Drink

Arabic drinks
Iftar foods
Syrian cuisine
Islamic culture
Apricots